Cathy Dennis is a British singer-songwriter, record producer and actress. After a moderately successful international solo career, Dennis later received great success as a writer of pop songs, scoring eight UK number ones and winning five Ivor Novello Awards. Together, her first two album sold more than 2 million copies worldwide.

Albums

Studio albums

Compilation and remix albums

Singles

Other appearances
These songs have not appeared on a studio album or single released by Dennis.

References

External links
Cathy Dennis Artist Profile on EMI Music Publishing
 

Discographies of British artists
Pop music discographies